The SL C9 was a metro stock used in the Stockholm metro, built by ASEA and Hägglund & Söner between 1976 and 1977. 20 cars were built. The C9 was built for the Blue line. The C9 would be more similar to the C7 stock than the C8 stock, because like the C7, the C9 used thyristors to control the traction motors and brakes. Also unlike the C6-C8, one C9 unit had a service weight of 25 tons, 2 tons more than the service weights of the C6, C7 and C8 stocks. Like the previous C8 stock, the C9 was delivered in the "Bernadotte" blue colour from the beginning. During its whole life, the C9 operated only on the blue line. It was in traffic from 1976 to 2009, when 19 out of the 20 wagons were scrapped. The unscrapped wagon, 2873, stood in Ågesta as a practice wagon for the fire service to practice in. However, 2873 was scrapped in October 2021 and replaced by two units of the older C6 stock.

References 

ASEA multiple units
Multiple units of Sweden
Stockholm metro